University House is a large 6 floor building in the centre of the University of Sheffield's campus.

Current usage 
The building is currently used to house part of the students' union on floors 1 to 4 and some administrative departments of the university.  Floor 1 contains the Union's Bar One drinks outlet, floor 2 is the Union's Foundry and Fusion venue, floor 3 is largely devoted to the Union of students reception and shop areas, floor 4 contains a university run food court, floor 5 another university food area, bar and Senior Common Room and floor 6 the student finance office.  Most of the university run departments, including the food courts and offices, are located in an isolated section of the building on the Western side.  The students' union occupies the Eastern "Link Building" section.  It is connected to the Octagon Centre on level 4 via a skyway.

History 
The original structure was built in 1963 and located to the west, isolated from the older Grave's Building to the east.  The building housed the union bar (now known as Bar One) and two food areas, the lower refectory (now the Foundry) and upper refectory (now  the City View cafe and Loxley's food court), amongst other offices and union departments.  The 5th floor was another catering area used by staff, and also housed a room for staff, known as the Senior Common Room (SCR).

During the mid-sixties the Union of students in conjunction with the university extended the building to connect it to the Graves building to the east and this section has become known as the "Link Building".  It is still part of the University House building however.  As a result, the floor numbering can become confusing, with slightly different physical levels between the three buildings all being assigned the same number and usually isolated from each other.  For instance level 4 in the Link building houses a student work area and sabbatical offices, in the original University House building it is the food court/cafe and in the Graves building it houses student union administrative and marketing offices.  It is not possible however to cross between these areas on one level - you must first descend to level three and then go back up again.

A £20 million refurbishment of the building took place between July 2012 and September 2013.

See also
University of Sheffield
Octagon Centre

References

External links
 University House website

Sheffield University buildings and structures